Take Me Now is a solo album by David Gates of Bread.

The album peaked at #62 on the Billboard chart.

Critical reception
Billboard praised the title track, calling it "an attractive midtempo ballad that's more upbeat than [Gates's] seamless pop classics of the early '70s."

Track listing
All tracks composed by David Gates except where noted
"It's You" - 3:47
"Take Me Now" - 3:23
"She's a Heartbreaker" - 2:36
"This Could Be Forever" - 3:23
"Come Home for Christmas" - 3:07
"Still in Love" (Hadley Hockensmith, Kelly Willard, David Gates) - 3:18
"Vanity" - 3:15
"Nineteen on the Richter Scale" - 3:31
"Lady Valentine" - 3:34
"It's What You Say" - 3:05

Personnel
David Gates - acoustic guitar (1, 4); guitar (2, 3, 10), bass (1, 2, 3, 4, 7); all instruments (5); keyboards (7); slide guitar (8); piano (9)
Hadley Hockensmith - lead guitar (1, 3, 7, 8); electric guitar (4, 6); bass (6)
Larry Knechtel - Fender Rhodes electric piano (1, 4); piano (2, 8); keyboards (3, 10); bass (9, 10)
Paul Leim - drums (1-4, 6, 8-10); percussion (4)
Mike Botts - drums (7)
Craig Gates - percussion (4) 
Tom Scott - alto saxophone (4) 
Chuck Findley - flugelhorn (9)
Dick Hyde - bass trumpet (9)

References

1981 albums
David Gates albums
Arista Records albums